Johnsonville Township may refer to the following townships in the United States:

 Johnsonville Township, Harnett County, North Carolina
 Johnsonville Township, Redwood County, Minnesota